Beachville-St. Inigoes is an unincorporated community in St. Mary's County, Maryland, United States. Located here is Webster Field, a branch of the larger Patuxent River Naval Air Station.

See also St. Inigoes Shores, which has much more information on these communities.

References

Unincorporated communities in St. Mary's County, Maryland
Unincorporated communities in Maryland